Kalle Kustaa Topias Könkkölä (16 January 1950 – 11 September 2018) was a Finnish politician and human rights activist. He was one of the two first Green members of the Finnish Parliament, from 1983 to 1987, even before the Green League became a political party. He was the first chairperson of the Green League and the first Finnish MP with a disability.

Könkkölä was born in Helsinki, and was physically disabled from birth. He was the executive director of the Threshold Association, a cross-disability organization which campaigns for the basic and human rights of persons with disabilities, including accessibility. He was married to architect Maija Könkkölä from 1976 until her death in 2012.

Könkkölä died of pneumonia on 11 September 2018, at the age of 68.

Publications 
 Huoneekseni tuli maailma, with Heini Saraste, 1996, WSOY
 Vammaiset, Suomi, Maailma, 1991

References

External links 
Home page
 Kynnys ry (Threshold association) homepage

1950 births
2018 deaths
Politicians from Helsinki
Green League politicians
Members of the Parliament of Finland (1983–87)
Finnish politicians with disabilities
Finnish disability rights activists
Deaths from pneumonia in Finland